A continuous-time Markov chain (CTMC) is a continuous stochastic process in which, for each state, the process will change state according to an exponential random variable and then move to a different state as specified by the probabilities of a stochastic matrix. An equivalent formulation describes the process as changing state according to the least value of a set of exponential random variables, one for each possible state it can move to, with the parameters determined by the current state.

An example of a CTMC with three states  is as follows: the process makes a transition after the amount of time specified by the holding time—an exponential random variable , where i is its current state. When a transition is to be made, the process moves according to the jump chain, a discrete-time Markov chain with stochastic matrix:

Equivalently, by the property of competing exponentials, this CTMC changes state from state i according to the minimum of two random variables, which are independent and such that  for  where the parameters are given by the Q-matrix 

Each non-diagonal entry  can be computed as the probability that the jump chain moves from state i to state j, divided by the expected holding time of state i. The diagonal entries are chosen so that each row sums to 0.

A CTMC satisfies the Markov property, that its behavior depends only on its current state and not on its past behavior, due to the memorylessness of the exponential distribution and of discrete-time Markov chains.

Definition
Let  be a probability space, let  be a countable nonempty set, and let  ( for "time"). Equip  with the discrete metric, so that we can make sense of right continuity of functions . A continuous-time Markov chain is defined by:
 for all distinct ,
 for all   (Even if  is infinite, this sum is a priori well defined (possibly equalling ) because each term appearing in the sum is nonnegative. Some authors instead use a definition that's word-for-word the same except for a modified stipulation , and say  is stable or totally stable to mean , i.e., every entry is real valued.)
This situation contrasts with the situation for discrete-time Markov chains, where all row sums of the transition matrix equal unity.

Now, let  such that  is -measurable. There are three equivalent ways to define  being Markov with initial distribution  and rate matrix : via transition probabilities or via the jump chain and holding times.

As a prelude to a transition-probability definition, we first motivate the definition of a regular rate matrix.

We say  is regular to mean that we do have uniqueness for the above system, i.e., that there exists exactly one solution. We say  is irregular to mean  is not regular. If  is finite, then there is exactly one solution, namely  and hence  is regular. If  is regular, then for the unique solution , for each ,  will be a stochastic matrix. We will assume  is regular from the beginning of the following subsection up through the end of this section, even though it is conventional to not include this assumption. (Note for the expert: thus we are not defining continuous-time Markov chains in general but only non-explosive continuous-time Markov chains.)

Transition-probability definition 
Let  be the (unique) solution of the system. (Uniqueness guaranteed by our assumption that  is regular.) We say  is Markov with initial distribution  and rate matrix  to mean: for any nonnegative integer , for all  such that  for all 

Using induction and the fact that  we can show the equivalence of the above statement containing and the following statement: for all  and for any nonnegative integer , for all  such that  for all  such that  (it follows that ),

It follows from continuity of the functions  that the trajectory  is almost surely right continuous (with respect to the discrete metric on ): there exists a -null set  such that .

Jump-chain/holding-time definition

Sequences associated to a right-continuous function 
Let  be right continuous (when we equip  with the discrete metric). Define

let 
 

Definition of the jump matrix Π 

where  is the zero set of the function

Jump-chain/holding-time property 

Infinitesimal definition 

,

Properties

Communicating classes
Communicating classes, transience, recurrence and positive and null recurrence are defined identically as for discrete-time Markov chains.

Transient behaviour
Write P(t) for the matrix with entries pij = P(Xt = j | X0 = i). Then the matrix P(t) satisfies the forward equation, a first-order differential equation

where the prime denotes differentiation with respect to t. The solution to this equation is given by a matrix exponential

In a simple case such as a CTMC on the state space {1,2}. The general Q matrix for such a process is the following 2 × 2 matrix with α,β > 0

The above relation for forward matrix can be solved explicitly in this case to give

However, direct solutions are complicated to compute for larger matrices. The fact that Q is the generator for a semigroup of matrices

is used.

Stationary distribution
The stationary distribution for an irreducible recurrent CTMC is the probability distribution to which the process converges for large values of t. Observe that for the two-state process considered earlier with P(t) given by

as t → ∞ the distribution tends to

Observe that each row has the same distribution as this does not depend on starting state. The row vector  may be found by solving

with the additional constraint that

Example 1

The image to the right describes a continuous-time Markov chain with state-space {Bull market, Bear market, Stagnant market} and transition rate matrix
 
The stationary distribution of this chain can be found by solving , subject to the constraint that elements must sum to 1 to obtain

Example 2

The image to the right describes a discrete-time Markov chain modeling Pac-Man with state-space {1,2,3,4,5,6,7,8,9}. The player controls Pac-Man through a maze, eating pac-dots. Meanwhile, he is being hunted by ghosts. For convenience, the maze shall be a small 3x3-grid and the monsters move randomly in horizontal and vertical directions. A secret passageway between states 2 and 8 can be used in both directions. Entries with probability zero are removed in the following transition rate matrix:

This Markov chain is irreducible, because the ghosts can fly from every state to every state in a finite amount of time. Due to the secret passageway, the Markov chain is also aperiodic, because the monsters can move from any state to any state both in an even and in an uneven number of state transitions. Therefore, a unique stationary distribution exists and can be found by solving , subject to the constraint that elements must sum to 1. The solution of this linear equation subject to the constraint is 
The central state and the border states 2 and 8 of the adjacent secret passageway are visited most and the corner states are visited least.

Time reversal
For a CTMC Xt, the time-reversed process is defined to be . By Kelly's lemma this process has the same stationary distribution as the forward process.

A chain is said to be reversible if the reversed process is the same as the forward process. Kolmogorov's criterion states that the necessary and sufficient condition for a process to be reversible is that the product of transition rates around a closed loop must be the same in both directions.

Embedded Markov chain  

One method of finding the stationary probability distribution, of an ergodic continuous-time Markov chain, Q, is by first finding its embedded Markov chain (EMC). Strictly speaking, the EMC is a regular discrete-time Markov chain. Each element of the one-step transition probability matrix of the EMC, S, is denoted by sij, and represents the conditional probability of transitioning from state i into state j. These conditional probabilities may be found by

From this, S may be written as

where I is the identity matrix and diag(Q) is the diagonal matrix formed by selecting the main diagonal from the matrix Q and setting all other elements to zero.

To find the stationary probability distribution vector, we must next find  such that

From this,  may be found as

(S may be periodic, even if Q is not. Once  is found, it must be normalized to a unit vector.)

Another discrete-time process that may be derived from a continuous-time Markov chain is a δ-skeleton—the (discrete-time) Markov chain formed by observing X(t) at intervals of δ units of time. The random variables X(0), X(δ), X(2δ), ... give the sequence of states visited by the δ-skeleton.

See also

 Kolmogorov equations (Markov jump process)

Notes

References

 
 Leo Breiman (1992) [1968] Probability. Original edition published by Addison-Wesley; reprinted by Society for Industrial and Applied Mathematics . (See Chapter 7)
 
 
 J. L. Doob (1953) Stochastic Processes. New York: John Wiley and Sons .
 A. A. Markov (1971). "Extension of the limit theorems of probability theory to a sum of variables connected in a chain". reprinted in Appendix B of: R. Howard. Dynamic Probabilistic Systems, volume 1: Markov Chains. John Wiley and Sons.
 
 S. P. Meyn and R. L. Tweedie (1993) Markov Chains and Stochastic Stability. London: Springer-Verlag . online: MCSS . Second edition to appear, Cambridge University Press, 2009.
  Classical text. cf Chapter 6 Finite Markov Chains pp. 384ff.
 John G. Kemeny & J. Laurie Snell (1960) Finite Markov Chains, D. van Nostrand Company 
 E. Nummelin. "General irreducible Markov chains and non-negative operators". Cambridge University Press, 1984, 2004. 
 Seneta, E. Non-negative matrices and Markov chains. 2nd rev. ed., 1981, XVI, 288 p., Softcover Springer Series in Statistics. (Originally published by Allen & Unwin Ltd., London, 1973) 
 

Markov processes